The 1963 All-Ireland Minor Football Championship was the 32nd staging of the All-Ireland Minor Football Championship, the Gaelic Athletic Association's premier inter-county Gaelic football tournament for boys under the age of 18.

Kerry entered the championship as defending champions.

On 22 September 1963, Kerry won the championship following a 1-10 to 0-2 defeat of Westmeath in the All-Ireland final. This was their seventh All-Ireland title overall and their second title in succession.

Results

Connacht Minor Football Championship

Quarter-Final

Leitrim 2-7 Sligo 0-7 Manorhamilton.

Semi-Finals

Roscommon 4-11 Leitrim 1-7 Castlebar.

Mayo 3-7 Galway 3-4 Tuam.

Final

Mayo 3-5 Roscommon 1-5 Castlebar Ref: George O'Toole Leitrim.

Leinster Minor Football Championship

Munster Minor Football Championship

Ulster Minor Football Championship

All-Ireland Minor Football Championship

Semi-Finals

August 4th Kerry 1-14 Mayo 2-7 Croke Park. 

Final

Championship statistics

Miscellaneous

 Westmeath qualify for the All-Ireland final for the first time in their history.

References

1963
All-Ireland Minor Football Championship